Nupserha apicata is a species of beetle in the family Cerambycidae. It was described by Léon Fairmaire in 1891.

Varietas
 Nupserha apicata var. elgonensis (Aurivillius, 1914)
 Nupserha apicata var. albovitticollis Breuning, 1960
 Nupserha apicata var. fuscoampiata Breuning, 1958
 Nupserha apicata var. atricornis Breuning, 1956
 Nupserha apicata var. cinerascens Aurivillius, 1925
 Nupserha apicata var. cruciata (Aurivillius, 1914)
 Nupserha apicata var. apicefusca Breuning, 1953
 Nupserha apicata var. latesuturalis Breuning, 1950
 Nupserha apicata var. inapicata Breuning, 1958
 Nupserha apicata var. invittata Breuning, 1958
 Nupserha apicata var. subgracilis Breuning, 1950
 Nupserha apicata var. mediolatevittata Breuning, 1953
 Nupserha apicata var. kivuensis Breuning, 1956
 Nupserha apicata var. lateriflava Breuning, 1950
 Nupserha apicata var. apicaloides Breuning, 1949
 Nupserha apicata var. latevittata Breuning, 1950
 Nupserha apicata var. mediofuscipennis Breuning, 1956
 Nupserha apicata var. subhumerovittata Breuning, 1953
 Nupserha apicata var. vagemaculata Breuning, 1950
 Nupserha apicata var. nigrescens Breuning, 1958
 Nupserha apicata var. nigroantennata Breuning, 1958
 Nupserha apicata var. presuturevittata Breuning, 1958
 Nupserha apicata var. pseudapicata Breuning, 1958
 Nupserha apicata var. fordi Duffy, 1953
 Nupserha apicata var. lateriinfusca Breuning, 1958
 Nupserha apicata var. subvariabilis Breuning, 1958
 Nupserha apicata var. suturelineata Breuning, 1950
 Nupserha apicata var. transversicollis Breuning, 1950
 Nupserha apicata var. unicolor Aurivillius, 1926
 Nupserha apicata var. subcruciata Breuning, 1950

References

apicata
Beetles described in 1891